James Phillip Rome (born October 14, 1964) is an American sports radio host. His talk show, The Jim Rome Show, is syndicated by CBS Sports Radio.

Broadcasting from a studio near Los Angeles, California, Rome hosts The Jim Rome Show on radio. For a number of years Rome hosted a television show Jim Rome Is Burning (formerly Rome Is Burning), which aired on ESPN in the United States and TSN2 in Canada. In 2011, Rome ended his relationship with ESPN to join the CBS network where he hosts his own show, as well as an interview-format show on the Showtime channel. His past hosting jobs included sports discussion television shows Talk2 (ESPN2), The FX Sports Show (FX), and The Last Word (Fox Sports Net).  The Jim Rome Show is tied for the #21 most listened to talk radio show in the United States  and Rome is the #29 most influential talk radio personality according to Talkers Magazine.

From April 2012 to March 2015, Rome had a television sports talk show on CBS Sports Network named Rome. During the same time period he had a monthly TV sports/entertainment talk show on Showtime named Jim Rome on Showtime.

Personal life
Born in Los Angeles, California, Rome graduated from Calabasas High School in 1982 and the University of California, Santa Barbara (UCSB) with a degree in Communications in 1987. He lives in Irvine, California, with his wife, Janet, and their two sons, Jake and Logan.

Broadcasting career 

Rome started his radio career at college radio station KCSB-FM while at UCSB, where he was sports director for one quarter, and at news station KTMS, also located in Santa Barbara, where he began as a traffic reporter and became a sports talk host in summer 1987. At the end of 1990, he moved to XTRA Sports 690 in San Diego, where he started what is now known as The Jim Rome Show, or "The Jungle," with a loop of the instrumental intro of Iggy Pop's song "Lust for Life" and the instrumental intro of Guns N' Roses' song "Welcome to the Jungle" as the show's signature music.

The show's production moved to a studio in downtown Los Angeles in spring 1994, though the broadcast was still originated by XTRA San Diego. At the same time as the studio move, the show start time shifted to 9am Pacific/12pm Eastern, where it remains as of 2022. The program was syndicated in 1996 through Premiere Radio Networks, which sold it to an assortment of local stations including ESPN Radio affiliates. A new contract that took effect in January 2013 brought the program to the CBS Sports Radio network, which simulcasts the program on its local FM/AM stations, its SiriusXM satellite channel, and its cable TV channel.

Over time, the show's production facility moved to the Premiere Radio building in Sherman Oaks, then an undisclosed Orange County location, and finally, as part of the start of TV simulcasting in January 2018, a custom-built studio in Costa Mesa. Due to past incidents of the studio being invaded by callers, the exact addresses of the former and current Orange County studios are not publicized. To provide continuity across the show's eras in San Diego, Los Angeles, and Orange County, it is consistently referred to as originating from "Southern California." In 2005, the TV versions of the show were criticized for obscuring the studio's location by using the "Southern California" terminology and footage of the downtown Los Angeles skyline despite originating almost 40 miles away in the Costa Mesa area.

The radio show is heard on more than 200 stations across the United States and Canada and has an audience of approximately 2.5 million. In 1998, Rome released an album entitled Welcome to the Jungle, which featured memorable sound bites and music from the show.

In early 2003, Rome was interviewing friend Mark Shapiro, executive producer of programming and production at ESPN, on his radio program. Unexpectedly, the two began to discuss a possible return of Rome to ESPN, and within a few months, Rome was officially rehired to host Rome Is Burning. Rome  openly attributes that interview as the impetus to his return to television.

Controversy and incidents 

Rome gained notoriety in 1994 for an incident on his ESPN2 television show, Talk2, when his guest was NFL quarterback Jim Everett. Rome had often referred to Everett on radio as "Chris" (after Chris Evert, the female tennis player), suggesting that Everett was less than a man whenever he shied away from getting hit.  Everett appeared as a guest on the television show, where he warned Rome about repeating the insult.  Rome continued to address Everett as "Chris" and Everett overturned the table between them and shoved Rome to the floor while still on the air. Their confrontation resulted in no legal action, although Rome publicly apologized to Everett. Rome considers that event one of his early career mistakes.

In 1997, hockey legend Gordie Howe announced an attempt to play a shift with the International Hockey League's Detroit Vipers, which would allow Howe to claim having played professional hockey in six decades. Rome challenged the 69-year-old ex-hockey star, offering a bounty of $3,000 to any player on the team playing against the Vipers to take Howe out of the game permanently by saying, "Putting this old fool back to reality."  Rome clarified that the statements were a joke.

In 2012, Rome was involved in a controversy with NBA Commissioner David Stern. During an interview, Rome asked Stern about the conspiracy theories that the NBA Draft Lottery was fixed in favor of the New Orleans Hornets, and he asked, "Was the fix in for the lottery?" Stern replied with two answers: "Number one, no; and a statement, shame on you for asking." He then proceeded to ask Rome the loaded question example of "Have you stopped beating your wife yet?" and accused Rome of "making a career out of cheap thrills". This led to a heated exchange between Rome and Stern, ending when Stern said he had "to go call someone important like Stephen A. Smith."

On January 1, 2015, Rome sent out a tweet that stated, "Is there anyone not in a marching band who thinks those dorks running around with their instruments are cool?" After a backlash, he later deleted the tweet and issued an apology. The incident also inspired the hashtag "#MarchOnRome".

Celebrity appearances 
Rome made cameo appearances in the movies Space Jam,
Two for the Money, and the 2005 remake of The Longest Yard. He appeared in Blink-182's music video "What's My Age Again?" and appeared on the HBO sitcom Arliss. Rome was parodied in the South Park episode "Sarcastaball", and the Jim Everett altercation was spoofed in the episode "The F Word".

On May 3, 2004, Rome hosted the memorial service for Pat Tillman.  On January 28, 2006, Rome was elected to the Southern California Jewish Sports Hall of Fame.

The Oliver Stone film Any Given Sunday features John C. McGinley playing the brash sportscaster "Jack Rose," a character based on Jim Rome.

Horse racing

After poking fun at horse racing for some years, saying "it's not a sport, it's a bet," Rome seemed to take more interest in horse racing after interviewing Hall of Fame jockey Kent Desormeaux many times on his radio talk show.  Rome thereafter took up a stronger interest in buying Thoroughbreds.   He first became a part owner in Wing Forward, who, in his North American debut, made a dramatic last-to-first comeback to win the race.  Rome mentioned it as "one of the most amazing experiences I've ever had."  In 2008, Jim and his wife Janet purchased a stake in a two-year-old colt, giving them a potential shot at the Triple Crown stakes races in 2009. Listeners suggested names for the horse, who was eventually named Gallatin's Run.

By 2012, Rome owned part or all of 14 horses in connection with multiple partnerships including his own stable, Jungle Racing, LLC. The first to gain national attention was the winner of the 2012 and 2013 Breeders' Cup Turf Sprint, a filly named Mizdirection. He described his feelings upon winning the Breeder's Cup race, saying, “I’ve just had a moment I’ve never experienced in my life. That was absolutely awesome.”  He purchased an interest in her for $50,000 in 2010.  He co-owned the mare with Bill Strauss, Danny Gohs, Borris Beljak, and Kevin Nish.  Mizdirection won 11 of 17 starts and retired from racing with  $1,719,621 in earnings.  She was usually ridden by jockey Mike Smith.  Two days after her 2014 Breeders' Cup win, Mizdirection was purchased for $2.7 million at the Fasig-Tipton sale by Al Shaqab Racing of Qatar, owned by Sheikh Joaan Al Thani, and retired to become a broodmare.

Rome's next significant race horse was Shared Belief, a gelding by Candy Ride, named the Eclipse Award winner in the two-year-old male division for 2013. As a three-year-old, he continued winning, and closed out the 2014 year with a record of eight wins in nine races (Five of six races in 2014 alone) and over $2 million in earnings, again with Mike Smith as his regular rider.  As a four-year-old, the horse defeated 2014 Kentucky Derby winner and horse of the year California Chrome in both horses' first race of the season, then Shared Belief went on to a decisive win in the Santa Anita Handicap.

References

External links
 
 Southern California Jewish Sports Hall of Fame profile

1964 births
Living people
American sports radio personalities
American television sports announcers
American television talk show hosts
University of California, Santa Barbara alumni
People from Irvine, California
People from Tarzana, Los Angeles
American racehorse owners and breeders
20th-century American Jews
21st-century American Jews